This is a list of companies founded by Massachusetts Institute of Technology alumni, including attendees who enrolled in degree-programs at MIT but did not eventually graduate. This list is not exhaustive, as it only includes notable companies  of which the founding and development history is well recorded by reliable sources. In particular, subsidiaries are listed with their owners in parentheses.

MIT is one of the leading universities worldwide in attracting funding for start-up companies, and its alumni have founded numerous companies. According to PitchBook,  from 2006 to 2017, MIT produced 907 company founders as alumni or current students, creating 780 companies, third most among all universities in the world. In addition, according to a report of MIT Sloan School of Management in 2015, some 30,000 companies founded by MIT alumni were active, employing 4.6 million people and producing annual revenues of $1.9 trillion, roughly equivalent to the 10th-largest economy in the world (2014). Approximately 40% of MIT founders are serial entrepreneurs, starting multiple companies, and 23% of MIT alumni's new companies are founded outside the United States.

In this list, founders of a company which merged with other companies to form a new company are counted as founders of the new company. However, founders of a company which later dissolved into several successor companies are not counted as founders of those successor companies; this same rule applies to spin-off companies. Finally, a defunct company is a company that stopped functioning completely (e.g., bankrupt) without dissolving, merging or being acquired.

Top companies by revenues

Fortune Global 500 (2017) 
This list shows companies in Fortune Global 500 founded or co-founded by MIT alumni. The cut-off revenue for 2017 Fortune Global 500 companies is $21,609M in 2016.
*: Koch Industries is not listed in Fortune Global 500. Its revenue is provided by Forbes.

**: Merger of different companies, at least one of which was founded by MIT alumni.

Fortune 1000 (2017) 
This list shows companies in Fortune 1000 (only for companies within the U.S.) founded or co-founded by MIT alumni. The cut-off revenue for 2017 Fortune 1000 companies is $1,791M in 2016.

*: Koch Industries and Bose Corporation are not listed in Fortune 1000. Their revenues are given by Forbes.

**: Merger of different companies, at least one of which was founded by MIT alumni.

Former Fortune-listed companies 
For each company, only the latest rankings (up to three years) are shown in this list. 

*: "International Data Group" is not listed in Fortune 1000. Its revenue ($3,800M, 2015) is given by Forbes, making it equivalent to the 613th position in Fortune 1000 (2016).

Timeline

Index 
This index also contains companies listed in section "Notable defunct & dissolved".

2000–present

1980–1999

1960–1979

1900–1959

Before 1900

Notable defunct & dissolved

See also 
 List of companies founded by Harvard University alumni
 List of companies founded by Stanford University alumni
 List of companies founded by UC Berkeley alumni
 List of companies founded by University of Pennsylvania alumni
 List of Massachusetts Institute of Technology alumni

References 

Massachusetts Institute of Technology
Massachusetts Institute of Technology alumni